Beth Wilson was an Australian public servant.

Beth Wilson may also refer to:

Beth Wilson (Shortland Street character) character from the New Zealand soap Shortland Street
Beth Wilson (The Only Way is Essex)

See also
Elizabeth Wilson (disambiguation)